2022 Haruku Island riot was a riot that occurred on 26 January 2022, a riot between villagers of Kariu village and Pelauw village as well Ori village in Haruku Island, Central Maluku Regency. The riot was caused by a dispute over land borders close to the boundaries between the villages. Three people died in the riot and 211 houses burned down. Additionally, four people were injured. Hundreds of villagers took refuge in nearby forests following the violence.

This riot is also between villages with different religions (Pelauw and Ori residents are predominantly Islam, Kariu residents are predominantly Protestant) but local religious leaders denied and stated that the riot was not a religious conflict.

Background 
Animosity between the two villages dated back far before the riot. Kariu village consisted of a small group of nomads that inhabits the region around Aboru and Wassu. Pelauw, also known as Matasiri, was a small kingdom located in the same region. After the arrival of the Dutch, a fort was constructed on the eastern side of Pelauw on 1656. Dutch troops there often asked villagers of Pelauw to help them hunt boars in the forest. Pelauw was majority Muslim and its king, Upu Latu Mawarakan, disliked the Pelauw villagers' helping the Dutch to hunt boars. At the same time, the group of people who would found Kariu village heard about hunting activities in the jungle and asked if they could participate in the hunt. As a result, the king of Pelauw awarded them with lands close to the fort. In exchange, they took the places of Pelauw villagers in helping Dutch troops hunt boars. Kariu village was soon grew in size and nominally became independent from Pelauw.

In 1933, conflict erupted between the two villages after a Pelauw villager was allegedly shot by a Kariu villager. As the result, villagers of Kariu were forced to relocate across the Marike'e river by the king of Pelauw, which would become the customary boundary between the two villages. During the Maluku sectarian conflict, many villagers of Kariu took refugee across the customary boundary of two villages until the Second Malino Accord ended the conflict. At the end of the conflict, the resettlement of Kariu villagers inside Pelauw was tough due to a perceived boundary and as a result some Kariu villagers remained and settled down. Relations deteriorated further following the alleged destruction of Pelauw customary site by Kariu villagers and a Kariu village claim to the eastern part of Ua Rual inside Pelauw village. Pelauw villagers reported such actions to local police several times to resolve the issue but received no significant response, prompting further tensions between the two villages. In addition, police personnels of Kariu origin were seen as pro-Kariu by Pelauw villagers. On 26 January 2022, a villager was shot dead on Maraka'e bridge close to the customary boundaries between to villages, which erupted into conflict between the villages.

Chronologies
25 January 2022
The riot started when one of the residents of Kariu opened a garden and a resident of Ori rebuked that the land did not belong to the village of Kariu.
25 January 2022 on 14:30 Eastern Indonesia Time, an argument about the land between several local residents broke out. After that, the two residents returned to their respective villages and reported it to the community members, resulting in mass gathering at the border of the two villages.
The debate between residents resulted in a conflict between the residents of Ori and Kariu on Tuesday night.
26 January 2022
In the early hours of the morning, residents of Ori and Pelauw carried out attacks and set fire to settlements in Kariu.
Combined military and police personnel were deployed to guard the border between Kariu and Ori.
27 January 2022
King of Pelauw and Ori held a meeting with the Regent of Central Maluku and representatives of the military and police agreed to end the conflict with the Kariu village.
The joint military and police apparatus evacuated Kariu citizens who had fled to the mountains.

Loss
As a result of the clashes between the residents of Ori and Pelauw with Kariu, three people died, four residents were injured and one officer police suffered gunshot wounds. Several residents of Kariu also fled to the forest and hundreds of others fled to the neighbouring Aboru village.

A total of 211 housing units for Kariu residents were damaged after the clashes with Pelauw and Ori. Based on Maluku Regional Police data, 183 buildings were seriously damaged and 28 were lightly damaged. Vehicles were also damaged in the clashes, with details in the form of 19 citizen motorbikes, three police motorbikes, one army motorbike, and nine cars.

Aftermath 

Following the riot, one company of the Mobile Brigade Corps was deployed on the villages. Injured victims of the riot were evacuated to Ambon. Kodam XVI/Pattimura deployed troops to the village. Many prominent figures in Indonesia responded to the riot. Sultan of Ternate, Mudaffar Sjah, urged villagers to "not be provoked by information that could sever brotherhood". The Mayor of Ternate, Tauhid Soleman, also urged people to remain calm to prevent the spread of violence. A peace agreement between the two villages was established at night on the same day.

Advocate groups form the village blamed authorities for not responding to complaints of Pelauw villagers as the cause of the conflict. Fearing of repeating sectarian conflict in Maluku, university students from Maluku in Yogyakarta staged a demonstration urging both sides to upheld peace and raise concern about the situation. Another group of university students in Palu from North Maluku also urged both sides to remain calm and not to be provoked.

A protest in Ambon was staged by students under the Indonesian Christian Student Movement to ask the governor of the province, Murad Ismail, to pay attention to the conflict. Chief Police of Maluku province visited the site after the violence to negotiate between two villages. Regent of Central Maluku and commander of Kodam XVI/Pattimura also paid visit to the site after the violence. Chief Police of Maluku, Lotharia Latif, proposed the dispute to be settled by customary law of both villages if possible, adding that legal solution as alternative if the dispute is not resolved after that.

Parliament of Maluku province urged the provincial government to construct housing for displaced Kariu villagers. Other than that, the parliament blamed police and military for having weak intelligence on the matters and failed to prevent the conflict. Chief police resort of Haruku district, Subhan Amin, was accused of not neutral and siding with Kariu village, with images of him shakehand with Kariu villagers in front off a church circulating. The claim was denied by the police later on. A charity concert for the conflict was held by group of artists in Ambon, Maluku, in addition of a vaccination booth.

Regent of Central Maluku, Tuasikal Abua, claimed that the regency government lacked fund to resettle displaced Kariu villagers. The claim was harshly criticized by provincial parliament, citing that the regency's action of only waiting for money from central government was regrettable and politically motivated, and the lack of fund claim was not true. On 4 February 2022, Subhan Amin was discharged from his position as chief police resort of Haruku, together with several other police officers in the aftermath of the riot.

See also
Maluku sectarian conflict
Southeast Maluku riot

References 

Central Maluku Regency
2022 in Indonesia
Riots and civil disorder in Indonesia
History of Maluku (province)